A child disability allowance is a payment made by the government of New Zealand to the parent or guardian of a seriously disabled child who incurs regular costs by having a disability. It is not means-tested.  The child must have been assessed as needing constant care and attention for at least 12 months because of a serious disability.

References

Disability in New Zealand
Social security in New Zealand